The 1922 Richmond Spiders football team was an American football team that represented the University of Richmond as an independent during the 1922 college football season. Led by ninth-year head coach, Frank Dobson, Richmond compiled a record of 6–2–1. The team avenged the previous year's loss to Hampden–Sydney.

Schedule

References

Richmond
Richmond Spiders football seasons
Richmond Spiders football